Amy Mary Dalby (3 January 1888 – 10 March 1969) was an English actress of stage and screen, often in kindly or eccentric spinster roles.

Amy first acted at the age of six. Her final performance was in the 8 March 1969 episode "The Battle of Godfrey's Cottage" of Dad's Army, portraying the sister of Private Godfrey. She died in London on 10 March—two days after the episode aired.

Partial filmography

 On the Night of the Fire (1939) - Hospital Nurse (uncredited)
 Quiet Wedding (1941) - Miss Dacres (uncredited)
 Penn of Pennsylvania (1942) - Hannah - Penn's Maid (uncredited)
 The Night Has Eyes (1942) - Miss Miggs
 The Great Mr. Handel (1942)
 The Gentle Sex (1943) - Lady Behind the Bar at the Dance (uncredited)
 Variety Jubilee (1943) - A Suffragette (uncredited)
 Dear Octopus (1943) - (uncredited)
 Millions Like Us (1943) - Mrs. Bourne - Hostel Matron (uncredited)
 Waterloo Road (1945) - Maisie - Tillie's Aunt (uncredited)
 The Wicked Lady (1945) - Aunt Doll
 Pink String and Sealing Wax (1945) - Lady Customer In Shop (uncredited)
 Carnival (1946) - Aunt Mary (uncredited)
 The White Unicorn (1947) - Landlady (uncredited)
 My Sister and I (1948) - Female Cleaner
 It's Hard to Be Good (1948) - Bargee's Wife (uncredited)
 The Passionate Friends (1949) - Lady on underground (uncredited)
 Your Witness (1950) - Mrs. Widgely
 Home to Danger (1951) - Jessica Morton - Cook (uncredited)
 Brandy for the Parson (1952) - Postmistress
 Time Bomb (1953) - Sarah - Charlie's Wife (uncredited)
 The Straw Man (1953) - Lucy Graham
 The Man Upstairs (1958) - Miss Acres
 Further Up the Creek (1958) - Eadie Lovelace
 The Lamp in Assassin Mews (1962) - Victoria Potts
 The Haunting (1963) - Abigail Crain - Age 80 (uncredited)
 The Old Dark House (1963) - Gambler (uncredited)
 A Jolly Bad Fellow (1964) - Miss Crumb
 The Counterfeit Constable (1964) - Mrs. Throttle
 The Intelligence Men (1965) - Woman in Wardrobe Dept. (uncredited)
 The Secret of My Success (1965) - Mrs. Tate
 Fumo di Londra (1966) - Duchess of Bradford
 Who Killed the Cat? (1966) - Lavinia Goldsworthy
 The Spy with a Cold Nose (1966) - Miss Marchbanks
 Smashing Time (1967) - Demolished Old lady

References

External links

1888 births
1969 deaths
Actresses from London
People from Clerkenwell
English stage actresses
English film actresses
English television actresses
20th-century English actresses
20th-century British businesspeople